Congress of Chiropractic State Associations (COCSA) is a nonprofit organization formed with the mission of promoting a more unified profession for chiropractors. The organization hosts an annual conference which serves as a platform for the leaders in each state's chiropractic association to meet and share ideas to better serve their members.

In April 2002, they organized National Backpack Safety Month. In 2011, the group sued UnitedHealth Group and OptumHealth. In November of that year, Foot Levelers gave them a grant for $25,000 for the COCSA's participation in their speakership program.

References

External links

Further reading 

 
 
 
 
 
 
 

Non-profit organizations based in Kansas
Health industry trade groups based in the United States
Chiropractic organizations